The Help is an American sitcom television series which premiered on The WB on March 5, 2004. The show was a raunchy comedy that focused on the hard-luck life of a beauty school dropout who must work for the wealthy, spoiled Ridgeway family. The rest of the hired help are also quirky. The WB only aired seven episodes, the show ending on April 16, 2004, and canceled it in May 2004.

It was the last television series created by Ron Leavitt before his death from lung cancer in 2008.

Summary 
Maria is studying to be a beautician when she has to come home to nurse her sick mother. After her mother's death, Maria is forced to take her place as the wealthy Ridgeway family's maid. She soon discovers not only a class struggle between the Ridgeways and the help, but also an all-out war among the servants.

Cast

Main 
 Camille Guaty as Maria, the maid
 Al Santos as Ollie, the chauffeur
 Brenda Strong as Arlene Ridgeway, the rich lady
 Keri Lynn Pratt as Veronica Ridgeway, the pop-star daughter
 Megan Fox as Cassandra Ridgeway, the spoiled daughter
 Mindy Cohn as Maggie, the cook
 Marika Dominczyk as Anna, the nanny
 Graham Murdoch as Douglas Ridgeway, the "baby"
 Antonio Sabato Jr. as Dwayne, the trainer

Recurring 
 Tori Spelling as Molly, the dog walker
 Esther Scott as Doris, the older nanny
 Jack Axelrod as Grandpa Eddie
 David Faustino as Adam Ridgeway, the oldest son

Episodes

All seven episodes were directed by Gerry Cohen.

Reception
The premiere of The Help was the most watched program in the Friday 9:30–10:00 time slot on The WB in the 2003–04 season. The premiere was more popular among women than men aged 12–34 (2.0/8 versus 1.3/5).

Despite the premiere being the best performance in the time slot of the season on The WB the critics have nothing positive to say. Virginia Heffernan of The New York Times said the show "comes off like a school play, clumsily blocked, loudly acted and nearly shouted down by obligatory laughter and applause". Robert Bianco of USA Today pointed out that "this is the kind of show that opens with a doggie-doo joke and still finds a way to go downhill". Perhaps the harshest was Matthew Gilbert of The Boston Globe: "The WB's claim that 'The Help' is a 'biting satire' is only half true. No, it's not a satire, but yes, it does indeed bite. And it will be biting the dust before long, unless it can find a new cast, new writers, new producers, a new set, and an entirely new premise." In her review of the 2003–04 season Kay McFadden, television critic for The Seattle Times, classified The Help as "Never should have aired".

References

External links 
 

2000s American sitcoms
2004 American television series debuts
2004 American television series endings
Television series by Warner Bros. Television Studios
English-language television shows
The WB original programming
Mass media portrayals of the upper class
Television shows set in Miami
Television series created by Ron Leavitt